Dimitrios Metaxas (born 16 December 2003) is a Greek professional footballer who plays as a midfielder for Super League club Volos.

References

2003 births
Living people
Greek footballers
Greece youth international footballers
Super League Greece players
Volos N.F.C. players
Association football midfielders
Footballers from Central Greece
People from Euboea (regional unit)